The Origin of the Milky Way is a painting by the Italian late Renaissance master Jacopo Tintoretto, in the National Gallery, London, formerly in the Orleans Collection. It is an oil painting on canvas, and dates from ca.1575–1580.

According to myth, the infant Heracles was brought to Hera by his half-sister Athena, who later played an important role as a goddess of protection. Hera nursed Heracles out of pity, but he suckled so strongly that he caused Hera pain, and she pushed him away. Her milk sprayed across the heavens and there formed the Milky Way. With divine milk, Heracles acquired supernatural powers.

See also
The Origin of the Milky Way (Rubens)

External links
High definition image on Google art
Tintoretto's The Origin of the Milky Way, Smarthistory, video (5:19)
 The Origin of the Milky Way (podcast with transcript: Miranda Hinkley & Karly Allen, National Gallery London February 2009)

1570s paintings
Paintings by Tintoretto
Collections of the National Gallery, London
Milky Way in fiction
Paintings depicting Heracles
Paintings of Hera
Nude art
Breastfeeding in art
Paintings of children
Birds in art
Paintings formerly in the Orleans Collection